Ottoman invasion of Mani may refer to:

 Ottoman invasion of Mani (1770)
 Ottoman invasion of Mani (1803)
 Ottoman invasion of Mani (1807)
 Ottoman invasion of Mani (1815)